Charitable institutions attached to churches in Rome were founded right through the medieval period and included hospitals, hostels, and others providing assistance to pilgrims to Rome from a certain "nation", which thus became these nations' national churches in Rome.  These institutions were generally organized as confraternities and funded through charity and legacies from rich benefactors belonging to that "nation".  Often, they were  also connected to national  (ancestors of Rome's seminaries), where the clergymen of that nation were trained.  The churches and their riches were a sign of the importance of their nation and of the prelates that supported them.  Up to 1870 and Italian unification, these national churches also included churches of the Italian states (now called "regional churches").

Many of these organizations, lacking a purpose by the 19th century, were expropriated through the 1873 legislation on the suppression of religious corporations.  In the following decades, nevertheless, various accords – ending up in the Lateran Pacts – saw the national churches' assets returned to the Catholic Church.

Italian regional churches
 Abruzzo: Santa Maria Maddalena in Campo Marzio
 Apulia: Basilica di San Nicola in Carcere
 Basilicata: San Nicola in Carcere
 Calabria: San Francesco di Paola ai Monti
 Campania: Santo Spirito dei Napoletani
 Dalmatia: San Marco Evangelista in Agro Laurentino
 Emilia-Romagna: Santi Giovanni Evangelista e Petronio dei Bolognesi
 Istria: San Marco Evangelista in Agro Laurentino
 Lazio:
 Sant'Ignazio di Loyola in Campo Marzio
 Santa Maria in Ara Coeli (Rome)
 Santissimo Nome di Gesù all'Argentina
 Liguria: San Giovanni Battista dei Genovesi
 Lombardy:
 Santi Ambrogio e Carlo al Corso
 Santi Bartolomeo e Alessandro a Piazza Colonna (Bergamo)
 Marche: San Salvatore in Lauro
 Piedmont: Santissimo Sudario all'Argentina
 Sardinia: Santissimo Sudario all'Argentina
 Sicily: Santa Maria Odigitria al Tritone
 Tuscany:
 Basilica di San Giovanni Battista dei Fiorentini (Florence)
 San Giovanni Battista Decollato
 Santa Croce e San Bonaventura alla Pilotta (Lucca)
 Santa Caterina da Siena a Via Giulia (Siena)
 Umbria:
 Santi Benedetto e Scholastica (Norcia)
 Santa Rita da Cascia alle Vergini
 Venetia: San Marco Evangelista al Campidoglio

National churches

Africa
 Democratic Republic of the Congo: Natività di Gesu
 Eritrea: 
 Santo Stefano degli Abissini
 San Tommaso in Parione
 Ethiopia:
 Santo Stefano degli Abissini
 San Tommaso in Parione

Americas
 Argentina: Santa Maria Addolorata a Piazza Buenos Aires
 Canada: Nostra Signora del Santissimo Sacramento e Santi Martiri Canadesi
 Chile: Santa Maria della Pace
 Ecuador: Santa Maria in Via
 Mexico: Nostra Signora di Guadalupe e San Filippo Martire
 Peru: Sant'Anastasia al Palatino
 United States of America: 
San Patrizio a Villa Ludovisi
Santa Susanna alle Terme di Diocleziano (former)
 Venezuela: Nostra Signora di Coromoto

Asia
 Armenia
 Santa Maria Egiziaca (deconsecrated)
 San Biagio della Pagnotta
 San Nicola da Tolentino agli Orti Sallustiani
 Japan: Santa Maria dell'Orto
 Lebanon: San Marone
 Philippines: Santa Pudenziana
 Syria: Santa Maria della Concezione in Campo Marzio

Europe
 Albania:
 San Giovanni della Malva in Trastevere
 Sant'Atanasio a Via del Babuino (Græco-Byzantine rite)
 Austria:
 Santa Maria dell'Anima
 Santa Maria della Pietà in Camposanto dei Teutonici
 Belgium: San Giuliano dei Fiamminghi
 Croatia: 
 San Girolamo dei Croati
 San Marco Evangelista in Agro Laurentino (Dalmatia and Istria)
 Denmark: Santa Maria in Traspontina
 England:
 San Silvestro in Capite
 San Tommaso di Canterbury
 San Giorgio e Martiri Inglesi
 France:
 Santissima Trinità dei Monti
 San Luigi dei Francesi
 Sant'Ivo dei Bretoni (Brittany)
 Santi Claudio e Andrea dei Borgognoni (Burgundy)
 San Nicola dei Lorenesi (Lorraine)
 San Crisogono (Corsica)
 Germany:
 Santa Maria dell'Anima
 Santa Maria della Pietà in Camposanto dei Teutonici
 Santo Spirito in Sassia 
 Greece:
 San Basilio agli Orti Sallustiani (Græco-Byzantine rite)
 Santa Maria in Cosmedin (Græco-Melkite rite)
 San Teodoro al Palatino (Eastern Orthodox)
 Hungary: 
 Santo Stefano Rotondo al Celio
Santo Stefano degli Ungheresi (demolished)
 Santo Stefano in Piscinula (demolished)
 Ireland:
 Sant'Isidoro a Capo le Case
 San Clemente al Laterano
 San Patrizio a Villa Ludovisi (former)
 Santa Maria in Posterula (demolished)
 Lithuania:
  (within San Pietro in Vaticano)
 San Casimiro a Via Tusculano
 Malta:
 Santa Maria del Priorato
 San Giovanni Battista dei Cavalieri di Rodi
 Netherlands:
 Santa Maria della Pietà in Camposanto dei Teutonici
 Santa Maria dell'Anima
 Santi Michele e Magno
 Norway: Sant'Olav (within Santi Ambrogio e Carlo al Corso)
 Poland:
 Santo Stanislao dei Polacchi
 Resurrezione di Nostro Signore Gesù Cristo
 Portugal: Sant'Antonio dei Portoghesi
 Romania: San Salvatore alle Coppelle (Byzantine-Romanian rite)
 Russia: Sant'Antonio Abate all'Esquilino
 Scotland: 
 Sant'Andrea degli Scozzesi (deconsecrated)
 Il Pontificio Collegio Scozzese
 Spain:
 Nostra Signora del Sacro Cuore
 Santa Maria in Monserrato degli Spagnoli
 Santissima Trinità a Via Condotti
 San Carlino alle Quattro Fontane
 Sweden: Santa Brigida a Campo de' Fiori
 Switzerland:
 Santi Martino e Sebastiano degli Svizzeri
 San Pellegrino in Vaticano
 Ukraine:
 Santi Sergio e Bacco
 San Giosafat al Gianicolo
 Santa Sofia a Via Boccea (Byzantine-Ukrainian rite)

Note

References

Bibliography

External links
 

Lists of churches in Italy
 
+National churches
Rome-related lists